Ross the Builder was a Canadian children's television series which aired on CBC Television in 1958.

Premise
This series was hosted by Ross Snetsinger with his puppet Foster. They demonstrated the construction of various items.

 3 July 1958 - debut
 10 July 1958 - guest magician Michael Roth
 17 July 1958
 24 July 1958 - constructing model cars, guest cartoonist George Feyer
 31 July 1958 - constructing a telegraph, guest folk musician Jean Cavall
 7 August 1958
 14 August 1958 - constructing a model streetcar, also drawing demonstration with Foster, two other puppets and guest cartoonist George Feyer
 21 August 1958 - plaster of Paris sculpting is demonstrated, guest folk-singer Jean Cavall
 28 August 1958
 4 September 1958 - using cardboard to construct toys; guest folk musician Jean Cavall
 11 September 1958 - guest Jean Cavall 
 18 September 1958 - demonstration of sketching of life
 25 September 1958 - guest folk musician Ed McCurdy

Scheduling
This 15-minute series aired Thursdays 5 p.m. from 3 July to 25 September 1958.

Snetsinger and Foster joined the cast of Whistle Town which occupied the Thursday time slot from October 1958.

References

CBC Television original programming
1950s Canadian children's television series
1958 Canadian television series debuts
1958 Canadian television series endings
Black-and-white Canadian television shows
Canadian television shows featuring puppetry